The portrait, as a literary genre, is a written description or analysis of a person or thing. A written portrait often gives deep insight, and offers an analysis that goes far beyond the superficial.  It is considered a parallel to pictorial portraiture.

The imitation of painting is apparent in the name of the genre itself, which is a painting term. Historians of antiquity recognised the task of the portrait as representation; we find the beginnings of the narrative portrait in Livy and Tacitus. However, the portrait began to emerge from the need to describe yourself (self-portrait) or one's contemporaries, as in the Essays of Montaigne. This latter work develops a line of questioning around the movement of the representation of the individual (or of a society) from the pictorial mode to the discursive mode.

The portrait can be realised in prose or in verse. Its objectives vary according to context: sociocultural, sociopolitical, historical, or again according to the subjectivity of the portraitist (the writer). Thus one can speak of a fictional portrait (corresponding to the characters who populate the fictional universe of each author) as much as a realist one (representing real-life people).

The portrait oscillates between reality and fiction, between eulogy and satire, between one portrait which imitates its original and another which moves away from it (such as the caricatures found in newspapers or in Molière). Nevertheless, the objective portrait which describes the flaws and qualities of the individual represented (or equally the object or the idea) is quite widespread. The literary portrait evolved through the centuries and its development has been shaped by writers as well as literary critics and theorists.

The portrait in the seventeenth century 
It is from the 1650s that the portrait began to be defined as a literary genre. It is through the social innovations of the précieuses - such as La Grande Mademoiselle who, influenced by the portrait-laden works of Madeleine de Scudéry, gathered around her (as a salonnière or ‘salon hostess’) men of letters - that the portrait was transformed into a ‘diversion of society’.

The literary portrait held to the essential aesthetic rules of the pictorial mode - that is, it had to describe the individual (model) faithfully in order to distinguish it as a type apart. Nevertheless, it was not to be inferred from the recognition of the individual represented, but rather from the portraitist's style. This narrative representation had the function of highlighting fixed and timeless physical and mental features, as one sees in the works of Molière or in the Caractères by Jean de La Bruyère. It had to be achieved through layers of successive description - as in painting - which were only distinct phrases describing the real model's features.

The portrait in the eighteenth century 
The Age of Enlightenment heralded a new phase in the development of the literary portrait. It invaded literature and even contaminated music. Mozart and Beethoven excelled in this genre. Nevertheless, the portrait carried more of the psychology of the model represented than his or her physical appearance.

In Denis Diderot, it is precisely the pictorial portrait that is the occasion of a narrative self-portrait effected in the form of an artistic critique of the paintings and statues which were made of him. Thus he did not like the painting by Louis Michel van Loo portraying him:

The philosopher blamed the painter's wife for having prevented him from being himself: “It is this madwoman, madame Van Loo, who had come to gossip with him while he was being painted, who gave him that air, and who spoiled everything.” Diderot took to imagining what his portrait would have been like: 

After criticizing the portrait that portrays him, he writes:

He informs them, “My children, I tell you that it is not me,” and undertakes to trace in writing the real portrait of himself:

According to Diderot, only one painter managed to make a pictorial portrait of him in which he recognizes himself and that is Jean-Baptiste Garand: by an apparent irony of fate, this success was the result of chance: 

Moreover, the semi-private sphere of correspondence also allowed the sketching of portraits in principle intended solely for the use of the recipient of the letter. Thus, Marie Du Deffand, taking the thermal waters at Forges-les-Eaux, was able to draw a sharp and cheerful portrait of Madame de Pecquigny, the companion that fate had assigned her during her treatment: 

However, it is not so much her spirit - or the way she uses it - that irritates Marie Du Deffand as the woman's quirks:

Marie Du Deffand completes this portrait of an eccentric by linking her to her interlocutor: “I am sorry that you have in common with her the impossibility of staying a minute at rest.” After which she concludes, in accordance with the philosophy of resignation and disinterest she defends, the temporary nature of that which she will have to endure on this “holiday meeting”:

The portrait of the nineteenth century 
The evolution of the narrative portrait did not stop at the nineteenth century but, on the contrary, it became more refined and took on nuances through the intervention of Sainte-Beuve in the works or the critiques of such literary portraits.

In fact, the portrait found a true place in the novel where it represented not only real-life individuals but also fictional individuals (who could also be symbolic). It is in this way that the portrait became a predominant and recurring theme in the work of Balzac.

The portrait of the twentieth century 
The portrait continued its journey throughout the twentieth century with the modern novel. In Nathalie Sarraute (in the Portrait d'un inconnu) the features are not fixed, the temporality plays its role in the genre of the moving portrait, progressive, fragmented, as in the life of a human.

References

Literary genres